Sir Duncan McCallum (24 November 1888 – 10 May 1958) was a Scottish Unionist Party politician.
He was elected Member of Parliament (MP) for Argyllshire at a 1940 by-election.  McCallum remained as MP for the seat (renamed Argyll in 1950) until his death in 1958.

McCallum was born on 24 November 1888 in Fulham, London, son of Charles Whitton McCallum (the British music entertainer known as Charles Coborn).  McCallum was educated at Filey School, and Christ's Hospital. He won a Military Cross and was Mentioned in Despatches in the First World War during which his service took him to the Cameroons and to France. The years that followed the end of hostilities were scarcely less adventurous for him, for between 1920 and 1924 he was British liaison officer with the French in Syria and took part in a pioneering journey across the Syrian Desert in 1923. A party consisting of McCallum, Mr. Palmer, Consul in Damascus, Mahommed Ibn Bassam, a gold trader, drove from Syria to Baghdad in three cars, a Buick, an Oldsmobile, and a Lancia. This was the first official reconnaissance of the trans-desert route.

He undertook an even more ambitious journey in 1927. His regiment, The East Yorkshire, was quartered in Tientsin (now Tianjin), China, and he was Commandant of the British Legation Guard at Peking (now Beijing). He conceived the idea of motoring from Peking to London and was granted leave and permission for that purpose.

The expedition, which included his wife, left in two Buick cars in June 1927. They motored to Tientsin and then went by sea to Haiphong in Vietnam, the Chinese Civil War making an overland journey from north to south China impracticable. From Haiphong they went north to the Chinese frontier and then, turning south again, followed the line of the ancient Mandarin Road, the highway from China to Siam (now Thailand), through the rice-fields of Tonkin, (now the north of Vietnam), down the coast of Annam (central Vietnam), across the great plain of Cochin-China (southern Vietnam) to Saigon (now Ho Chi Minh City), and thence to Angkor and the Siamese frontier.

The party entrained at Bangkok, entered Malaya through Kedah, running south to Singapore, there taking ship to Rangoon and thence by sea to Calcutta, after spending a week trying to find an overland route into Burma. After reaching Calcutta they drove across India by way of Lahore, Peshawar, and Quetta, across the Balochistan desert, through north-eastern Persia to Meshed; thence to Teheran, Baghdad, Damascus, and Beirut. The journey from Constantinople (Istanbul) lay through Bulgaria at the time an earthquake occurred, and the party arrived from Adrianople at the village of Papazali the day after it had been laid in ruins. The journey was recounted by McCallum in his book China to Chelsea: A Modern Pilgrimage Along Ancient Highways (1930).

Subsequently, he served as an honorary attaché at British legations in Bulgaria and Egypt in 1939 and 1940, and Conservative member of Parliament for Argyll from 1940 to 1958. He was known as a successful breeder of pedigree Highland cattle and was a member of the Highlands and Islands Advisory Panel from 1947. He received a knighthood in 1955.

In 1925, McCallum married Violet Mary, daughter of J. L. A. Hope, and widow of Captain E. A. Hume. McCallum died on 10 May 1958, in a Glasgow nursing home. He was 69.

References

External links 
 
 

1888 births
1958 deaths
Unionist Party (Scotland) MPs
Members of the Parliament of the United Kingdom for Scottish constituencies
UK MPs 1935–1945
UK MPs 1945–1950
UK MPs 1950–1951
UK MPs 1951–1955
UK MPs 1955–1959